Stanley Stellar (born 1945) is an American photographer, living in Manhattan, who has photographed gay men in the West Village there since 1976. His work is included in the collection of Harvard Art Museums, as well as in the Artifacts at the End of a Decade portfolio, a copy of which is held in the collection of the Museum of Modern Art in New York.

Life and work
Stellar was born in New York City, growing up in Brooklyn in the 1950s and 1960s. He studied graphic design and photography at Parsons School of Design in New York City then began working as art director at Art Direction, an advertising agency.

In 1976, Stellar purchased a professional camera and began photographing the gay scene on the streets of Manhattan's West Village including Christopher Street, and on the Christopher Street Pier where men cruised for sex.

Publications

Books of work by Stellar
The Beauty of All Men, Photographs 1976–2011. All Saints, 2011. .
Into the Light: Photographs of the NYC Gay Pride Day from the 70s Till Today. Bruno Gmuender, 2018. .

Collections
Stellar's work is held in the following permanent collections:
Harvard Art Museums, Harvard University, Cambridge, Massachusetts: 1 print (as of 5 September 2022)
Museum of Modern Art, New York: 1 photograph, part of Artifacts at the End of a Decade (as of 5 September 2022)

Films
Stanley Stellar: Here For This Reason (2019) – Short Stories (HuffPost and RYOT Films); short film written and directed by Eric Leven

See also
Alvin Baltrop
Leonard Fink

References

External links

"Artifacts at the End of a Decade ‘Stanley Stellar’ (Dazed Digital Cut)" (4 minute video at Vimeo)

21st-century American photographers
20th-century American photographers
American LGBT photographers
Photographers from New York City
Parsons School of Design alumni
Living people
1945 births